Qaleh-ye Zorati (also Romanized as Qal‘eh-ye Z̄orātī, Qal‘eh-ye Z̄oratī, and Qal‘eh-ye Z̄orratī; also known as Kāla Zarat, Kāla Zarati, and Qal‘eh-ye Zarāt) is a village in Shaban Rural District, in the Central District of Nahavand County, Hamadan Province, Iran. At the 2006 census, its population was 104, in 28 families.

References 

Populated places in Nahavand County